Lesbian, gay, bisexual, and transgender (LGBT) rights are liberal in Bahia. Homosexuality and same-sex marriage are legal in the state.

Hate crimes and discrimination law
Bahia was the first Brazilian state to enact an anti-discrimination ordinance in 1997.

LGBT adoption
On March 9, 2010, the Justice of the city of Salvador, Bahia, authorized the adoption of a child by a lesbian couple.

Recognition of same-sex unions
Same-sex marriages have been recognized by notaries in the state of Bahia since November 26, 2012.

Statistics
According to the Grupo Gay da Bahia (Gay Group of Bahia – GGB), the book of homosexual stable union, instituted years ago, states that do not recognize registration of marriages in the registry, the Instituto Nacional de Segurança Social – INSS (National Institute of Social Security) still recognizes this document as a means for, occasionally, sharing inheritance, receiving a pension, etc. There are already 30 legal cases in the State of Bahia between gays and lesbians. This includes a case in which the companion died and the surviving spouse received the pension.

LGBT life

Activism and advocacy
Grupo Gay da Bahia, the oldest gay rights organization in Brazil, was founded in Salvador, Bahia in 1980.

Events
Salvador plays host to an annual Pride parade every September with 800,000 people having attended in 2010.

Homophobia
In 2004, Grupo Gay da Bahia released a list with the names of 159 murdered members of the LGBT community in that year. There is also a list with the names of people that allegedly suffered from human rights abuses in the same year. Some deaths caused directly by homophobia.

Healthcare
The program of prevention of STD/AIDS with transvestite sex workers of Bahia presents excellent results: after research on the local community, a booklet, a folder and a poster were produced, all with realistic language and images peculiar to this subculture. Every week safer sex workshops and direct contact with the transvestites in different prostitution areas are accomplished. In six months, the program recorded 900 interventions, and distributed 14,400 condoms. Programs of STD/AIDS together with transvestite sex workers must use strong elements of the local subculture and count on the trust of the social actor in order to be successful.

Politics
One of the candidates for city council of Salvador, Bahia, the third largest city in Brazil, that won the seat, was Leo Kret, a transvestite club dancer and was the most voted for of the candidates. So when she took office, she defied the dress code norms insisting that her wardrobe would be strictly feminine and insisted on using the women's restroom. 

Leo Kret received 12,861 votes in the city, by the Republican Party (PR-BA) in the municipal elections of 2008. In the day of election, she said that she will defend the LGBT rights. She has aspirations to become the president of Brazil one day.

References

Bahia
Bahia